Mustafa Cumhur Ersümer (born 1952, in Çanakkale) is a Turkish politician.

He graduated from Istanbul University Faculty of Law. He served as a freelance lawyer, member of the Radio and Television Supreme Council, 18th, 20th and 21st term Çanakkale deputy, Minister of Energy and Natural Resources and Deputy Prime Minister. 
He was referred to the Supreme Court by the TGNA on July 13, 2004 on the grounds that "He made the agreements and practices against Turkey in the Energy and Natural Gas Agreements, he committed mischief in the purchase and sale of the state, wrong and irregular energy policies applied and abused his office. The Supreme Court sentenced him to 1 year and 8 months imprisonment on 27 July 2007 and delayed his sentence.

References

1952 births
Deputy Prime Ministers of Turkey
Living people
Ministers of Energy and Natural Resources of Turkey
People from Çanakkale
Istanbul University Faculty of Law alumni